Dr. Samir Bishara (October 31, 1935 – October 8, 2010) was an Orthodontist from Egypt who received the highest honor from the World Federation of Orthodontists when they selected him to be the honorary fellow of the WFO.

Life
He was born in Cairo in 1935 to Edward and Georgette Bishara. He obtained his dental degree and his Orthodontic degree from Alexandria University. He practiced dentistry in Egypt for 11 years at Moassat Hospital in Alexandria after which he moved to New York City to work as a Pediatric Dentist at the Guggenheim Clinic. He then moved to University of Iowa College of Dentistry where he received his Orthodontic degree a second time. In 1968, he became a faculty at the Orthodontic Program of Iowa University and served there until 2010. Dr. Bishara was married to Anne Ghalioungui and had four daughters: Dina, Dorine, Cherine and Christine.

Orthodontics
Dr. Bishara has published over 200 scientific articles, where 100 of them are published solely in the American Journal of Orthodontics and Dentofacial Orthopedics. His research involved working with the growth and development and Dr. Bishara was a prominent figure in co-founding the biannual International Symposium on Dentofacial Function and Development. Dr. Bishara received honorary memberships in the Arab, Colombian, Egyptian, Greek, and Serbian Orthodontic Societies, the Guadalajara College of Dentists, and the Mexican Board of Orthodontics. He also served on the editorial boards of many orthodontic journals during his lifetime.

He has published an orthodontic textbook called Textbook of Orthodontics.

Death
Before he died, he was a still a Professor of Orthodontics at the University of Iowa College of Dentistry. He died at the age of 74 in 2010.

Awards and Recognitions

 Guggenheim Fellowship
 College of Diplomates of the ABO - President
 Diplomate of American Board of Orthodontics
 Founder’s Award of the College of Diplomates of the ABO
 Helen and B.F. Dewel Award - 1995
 Michael J. Brody Award for Faculty Excellence in Service to the University and the State of Iowa
 Honorary Doctorate Degree - Aristotle University of Thessaloniki in Greece

References

American dentists
Orthodontists
1935 births
2010 deaths
20th-century dentists